Bolin Branch is a  long 1st order tributary to Bearskin Creek in Pittsylvania County, Virginia.

Course

Watershed

See also
 List of Virginia Rivers

References

Rivers of Virginia
Rivers of Pittsylvania County, Virginia
Tributaries of the Roanoke River